PP2A subunit B isoform delta also known as serine/threonine-protein phosphatase 2A 55 kDa regulatory subunit B delta isoform is a protein that in humans is encoded by the PPP2R2D gene.  It is a regulatory subunit of the heterotrimeric protein phosphatase 2 enzyme.

References

Further reading